Necochea Airport  is an airport serving Necochea, an Atlantic coastal city in the Buenos Aires Province of Argentina.

See also

Transport in Argentina
List of airports in Argentina

References

External links
OpenStreetMap - Necochea Airport
FallingRain - Necochea Airport

Airports in Argentina